General Muhammad Zia-ul-Haq HI, GCSJ, ร.ม.ภ, (12 August 1924 – 17 August 1988) was a Pakistani four-star general and politician who became the sixth President of Pakistan following a coup and declaration of martial law in 1977. Zia served in office until his death in a plane crash in 1988. He remains the country's longest-serving de facto head of state and Chief of Army Staff.

Educated at St. Stephen's College, Delhi, Zia was commissioned in the British Indian Army in the Guides Cavalry on 12 May 1943 after graduating from the Officer Training School (OTS) Mhow as British Army Officer and fought against Japanese forces in World War II in Burma and Malaya, before opting for Pakistan in 1947. He fought as a tank commander in the Indo-Pakistani War of 1965. In 1970, he led a military training mission to Jordan, proving instrumental to defeating the Black September insurgency against King Hussein. In recognition, Prime Minister Zulfikar Ali Bhutto appointed Zia Chief of Army Staff in 1976 and awarded him the Hilal-i-Imtiaz medal.

Following civil disorder, Zia deposed Bhutto in a military coup and declared martial law on 5 July 1977. Bhutto was controversially tried by the Supreme Court and executed less than two years later for allegedly authorizing the murder of Nawab Muhammad Ahmed Khan Kasuri, a political opponent. Assuming the presidency in 1978, Zia played a major role in the Soviet–Afghan War. Backed by the United States and Saudi Arabia, Zia systematically coordinated the Afghan mujahideen against the Soviet occupation throughout the 1980s. This culminated in the Soviet Union's withdrawal in 1989, but also led to the proliferation of millions of refugees, with heroin and weaponry into Pakistan's frontier province.

Internationally Zia bolstered ties with China and the United States, and emphasized Pakistan's role in the Islamic world, while relations with India worsened amid the Siachen conflict and accusations that Pakistan was aiding the Khalistan movement. Domestically, Zia passed broad-ranging legislation as part of Pakistan's Islamization, curbed civil liberties, and heightened press censorship. He also escalated Pakistan's atomic bomb project, and instituted industrialization and deregulation, helping Pakistan's economy become the fastest-growing in South Asia, overseeing the highest GDP growth in the country's history. After lifting martial law and holding non-partisan elections in 1985, Zia appointed Muhammad Khan Junejo Prime Minister but accumulated more presidential powers via the Eighth Amendment to the Constitution. After Junejo signed the Geneva Accords in 1988 against Zia's wishes, and called for an inquiry into the Ojhri Camp disaster, Zia dismissed Junejo's government and announced fresh elections in November 1988. Muhammad Zia-ul-Haq was killed along with several of his top military officials and two American diplomats in a mysterious plane crash near Bahawalpur on 17 August 1988.

To this day, Zia remains a polarizing figure in Pakistan's history, credited with preventing wider Soviet incursions into the region as well as economic prosperity, but decried for weakening democratic institutions, passing laws encouraging religious intolerance, and depreciating the rupee with managed float policies. He is also cited for promoting the early political career of Nawaz Sharif, who would be thrice elected Prime Minister.

Zia is credited with stopping an expected Soviet invasion of Pakistan. Former Saudi intelligence chief Prince Turki Al-Faisal, who worked with Zia during the 1980s against the Soviets, described Zia in the following words: "He was a very steady and smart person with a geo-strategic mind, particularly after the invasion by Soviets. He was very dedicated in preventing the Soviet invasion of Pakistan."

Early life and family 

Muhammad Zia-ul-Haq was born into a Punjabi Arain family in Jullundar, Punjab Province of British India, on 12 August 1924. Zia-ul-Haq was the second child of Muhammad Akbar Ali, who worked in the administrative corps of the Army GHQ of India Command of British Armed Forces in Delhi and Simla, prior to the independence of India from British colonial rule in 1947. Zia's father was noted for his religiosity, and insisted that his seven children offer their daily morning prayers and learn the Qur’an. Due to his father's role in the civil service, Zia spent his childhood between the hill station of Simla and Jalandhar as Akbar Ali followed the British administration north during the summers.

After completing his initial education in Simla, Zia attended Delhi's prestigious St. Stephen's College, an Anglican missionary school, for his BA degree in History, from which he graduated with distinction in 1943.  He was admitted to the Indian Military Academy at Dehradun, graduating in May 1945 among the last group of officers to be commissioned before the independence of India. In 1947, while his family was in a refugee camp, Captain Zia was the escort officer for the last train of refugees to leave Babina, an armoured corps training center in Uttar Pradesh, a difficult journey that took seven days, during which the passengers were under constant fire as communal violence broke out in the aftermath of Partition.

In 1950, he married Shafiq Jahan, a relative, and the daughter of a Ugandan-Indian doctor from Kampala. Begum Shafiq Zia died on 6 January 1996. Zia is survived by his sons, Muhammad Ijaz-ul-Haq, (born 1953), who went into politics and became a cabinet minister in the government of Nawaz Sharif, and Anwar-ul-Haq (born 1960) and his daughters, Zain (born 1972), a special needs child, Rubina Saleem, who is married to a Pakistani banker and has been living in the United States since 1980, and Quratulain Zia who currently lives in London, and is married to Pakistani doctor, Adnan Majid.

Military service 
Zia was commissioned in the British Indian Army in the Guides Cavalry on 12 May 1943 after graduating from the Officer Training School Mhow and fought against Japanese forces in Burma in World War II. After Pakistan was created following the Partition of India in 1947, Zia joined the newly formed Pakistan Army as a Major in the Guides Cavalry Frontier Force Regiment. He also served in 13th Lancers and 6 Lancers. He was trained in the United States during 1962–1964 at the US Army Command and General Staff College at Fort Leavenworth, Kansas. After that, he returned to take over as Directing Staff (DS) at Command and Staff College, Quetta. During the Indo-Pakistani War of 1965, Zia is said to have been the Assistant Quartermaster of the 101st Infantry Brigade.

Role in Black September and protection by Gul Hasan

Brigadier Zia was stationed in Jordan from 1967 to 1970 as the head of a Pakistani training mission to Jordan. Zia-ul-Haq became involved on the Jordanian side of the military conflict against Palestinians known as Black September. Zia had been stationed in Amman for three years prior to Black September. During the events, according to CIA official Jack O'Connell, Zia was dispatched north by King Hussein to assess Syria's military capabilities. The Pakistani commander reported back to Hussein, recommending the deployment of a RJAF squadron to the region. Zia-ul-Haq then went on to plan the Jordanian offensive against the Palestinians and commanded an armoured division against them. O'Connell also reported that Zia personally led Jordanian troops during battles.

According to the testimonies provided by Major-General A. O. Mitha, it was the Army Chief of General Staff, Lieutenant General Gul Hasan's lobbying at the Army GHQ which also saved then Brigadier Zia-ul-Haq from being terminated. Brigadier Zia had been recommended to be court-martialled by Major-General Nawazish in his submission to President Yahya Khan for disobeying GHQ orders by commanding a Jordanian armoured division against the Palestinians, as part of actions during Black September in which thousands were killed. It was Gul Hasan who interceded for Zia after which Army Chief General Yahya Khan let Zia off the hook.

Ascent to Chief of Army Staff

He was then promoted as Lieutenant General and was appointed commander of the II Strike Corps at Multan in 1975. On 1 March 1976, Prime Minister Zulfikar Ali Bhutto approved then-three star rank general Lieutenant-General Zia as Chief of Army Staff and to be elevated to four-star rank.

At the time of his nominating the successor to the outgoing Chief of Army Staff General Tikka Khan, the Lieutenant Generals in order of seniority were: Muhammad Shariff, Akbar Khan, Aftab Ahmed, Azmat Baksh Awan, Ibrahim Akram, Abdul Majeed Malik, Ghulam Jilani Khan, and Muhammad Zia-ul-Haq. But, Bhutto chose the most junior, superseding seven more senior lieutenant-generals. However, the senior most at that time, Lieutenant-General Mohammad Shariff, though promoted to General, was made the Chairman of the Joint Chiefs of Staff Committee, a constitutional post akin to President Fazal Ilahi Chaudhry.

Husain Haqqani argues that Bhutto chose Zia ahead of many senior officers for ethnic and caste reasons, thinking that an Arain would not make an alliance with the predominantly Pashtun and Rajput military officers in order to overthrow him, and this is also the reason why he let Zia push for more Islam in the armed forces.

Planning of coup 

Prime Minister Bhutto began facing considerable criticism and increasing unpopularity as his term progressed; the democratic socialist's alliance who had previously allied with Bhutto began to diminish as time progressed. Initially targeting leader of the opposition Vali Khan and his opposition National Awami Party (NAP), also a socialist party. Despite the ideological similarity of the two parties, the clash of egos both inside and outside the National Assembly became increasingly fierce, starting with the Federal government's decision to oust the NAP provincial government in Balochistan Province for alleged secessionist activities and culminating in the banning of the party and arrest of much of its leadership after the death of a close lieutenant of Bhutto's, Hayat Sherpao, in a bomb blast in the frontier town of Peshawar.

Civil disorders against Bhutto
Dissidence also increased within the Pakistan Peoples Party (PPP), and the murder of leading dissident Ahmed Raza Kasuri's father led to public outrage and intra-party hostility as Bhutto was accused of masterminding the crime. PPP leaders such as Ghulam Mustafa Khar openly condemned Bhutto and called for protests against his regime. The political crisis in the North-West Frontier Province (NWFP now Khyber Pakhtunkhwa) and Balochistan intensified as civil liberties remained suspended, and an estimated 100,000 troops deployed there were accused of abusing human rights and killing large numbers of civilians.

1977 parliamentary elections
On 8 January 1977, a large number of opposition political parties grouped to form the Pakistan National Alliance (PNA). Bhutto called fresh elections, and PNA participated fully in those elections. They managed to contest the elections jointly even though there were grave splits on opinions and views within the party. The PNA faced defeat but did not accept the results, alleging that the election was rigged. They proceeded to boycott the provincial elections. Despite this, there was a high voter turnout in the national elections; however, as provincial elections were held amidst low voter turnout and an opposition boycott, the PNA declared the newly elected Bhutto government as illegitimate.

Coup d'état

Soon, all the opposition leaders called for the overthrow of Bhutto's regime. Political and civil disorder intensified, which led to more unrest. On 21 April 1977, Bhutto imposed martial law in the major cities of Karachi, Lahore and Hyderabad. However, a compromise agreement between Bhutto and opposition was ultimately reported. Zia planned the Coup d'état carefully, as he knew Bhutto had integral intelligence in the Pakistan Armed Forces, and many officers, including Chief of Air Staff Air Marshal Zulfiqar Ali Khan and Major-General Tajammul Hussain Malik, GOC of 23rd Mountain Division, Major-General Naseerullah Babar, DG of Directorate-General for the Military Intelligence (DGMI) and Vice-Admiral Syed Mohammad Ahsan, were loyal to Bhutto.

The coup, (called "Operation Fair Play") transpired in the small hours of 5 July 1977. Before the announcement of any agreement, Bhutto and members of his cabinet were arrested by troops of the Military Police under the order of Zia. Bhutto tried to call Zia but all telephone lines were disconnected. When Zia spoke to him later, he reportedly told Bhutto that he was sorry that he had been forced to perform such an "unpleasant task".

Zia and his military government portrayed the coup as a "spontaneous response to a difficult situation", but his response was a complete contradiction. Soon after the coup, Zia told the British journalist Edward Behr of Newsweek:

However, Zia's Chief of Army Staff General Khalid Mahmud Arif contradicted Zia's statement when Arif noted that the coup had already been planned, and the senior leadership of Pakistan Armed Forces had solid information. Therefore, Arif met with Bhutto on an emergency basis, stressing and urging Bhutto to "rush negotiations with the opposition". By Arif's and independent expert's accounts, the talks had not broken down even though the coup was very much in the offing. Zia further argued that Fair Play against Bhutto had been necessitated by the prospect of a civil war that Bhutto had been planning, by distributing weapons to his supporters. However, Arif strongly rejected Zia's remarks on Bhutto, and citing no evidence that weapons were found or recovered at any of the party's election offices, the military junta did not prosecute Bhutto on the charge of planning civil war.

Immediately, the Chief of Naval Staff Admiral Mohammad Shariff announced his and the navy's strong support for Zia and his military government. But, the Chief of Air Staff General Zulfikar Ali Khan remains unsupported while the Chairman Joint Chiefs of Staff Committee General Muhammad Shariff remains neutral, while he silently expressed his support to Prime minister Zulfikar Bhutto. In 1978, Zia pressured President Fazal Ilahi Chaudhry to appoint General Anwar Shamim as Chief of Air Staff; and Admiral Karamat Rahman Niazi as Chief of Naval Staff in 1979. On Zia's recommendation, President Illahi appointed Admiral Mohammad Shariff as Chairman of the Joint Chiefs of Staff, hence making the Admiral the highest-ranking officer and principal military adviser overlooking all of the inter-services, including the Chiefs of Staff of the respected forces. In 1979, the Chiefs of Army, Navy, and the Air Force, including the Chairman of the Joint Chiefs of Staff validated the coup as constitutional and legal under the war-torn circumstances, pledging their support to Zia as well.

United States sponsorship

The United States, notably the Reagan Administration, was an ardent supporter of Zia's military regime and a close ally of Pakistan's conservative-leaning ruling military establishment. The Reagan administration declared Zia's regime as the "front line" ally of the United States in the fight against the threat of Communism. American legislators and senior officials most notable were Zbigniew Brzezinski, Henry Kissinger, Charlie Wilson, Joanne Herring, and the civilian intelligence officers Michael Pillsbury and Gust Avrakotos, and senior US military officials General John William Vessey, and General Herbert M. Wassom, had been long associated with the Zia military regime where they had made frequent trips to Pakistan advising on expanding the idea of establishment in the political circle of Pakistan. Nominally, the American conservatism of Ronald Reagan's Republican Party influenced Zia to adopt his idea of Islamic conservatism as the primary line of his military government, forcefully enforcing the Islamic and other religious practices in the country.

The socialist orientation had greatly alarmed the capitalist forces in Pakistan and as well as brought a clinging bell tolls alarm to the United States who feared the loss of Pakistan as an ally in the cold war. Many of Pakistan's political scientists and historians widely suspected that the riots and coup against Zulfikar Ali Bhutto was orchestrated with help of the US Central Intelligence Agency (CIA) and the United States Government because United States growing fear of Bhutto's socialist policies which were seen as sympathetic towards the Soviet Union and had built a bridge that allowed Soviet Union to be involved in Pakistan, and had access through Pakistan's warm water port; something that the United States was unable to gain access since the establishment of Pakistan in 1947. Former US Attorney General Ramsey Clark widely suspected the United States' involvement in bringing down the Bhutto's government, and publicly accused the United States' Government after attending the trial. On the other hand, the United States refused any involvement in Bhutto's fall, and argued that it was Bhutto who had alienated himself over the five years. While witnessing the dramatic fall of Bhutto, one US diplomat in American Embassy in Islamabad wrote that:

Postponement of elections and call for accountability 
After assuming power as Chief Martial Law Administrator, Zia shortly appeared on national television, PTV promising to hold new and neutral parliamentary elections within the next 90 days 
My sole aim is to organize free and fair elections which would be held in October this year. Soon after the polls, power will be transferred to the elected representatives of the people. I give a solemn assurance that I will not deviate from this schedule.
He also stated that the Constitution of Pakistan had not been abrogated, but temporarily suspended.  Zia did not trust the civilian institutions and legislators to ensure the country's integrity and sovereignty therefore, in October 1977, he announced the postponement of the electoral plan and decided to start an accountability process for the politicians. On television, Zia strongly defended his decision for postponing the elections and demanded that "scrutiny of political leaders who had engaged in malpractice in the past". Thus, the PNA adopted its policy of "retribution first, elections later". Zia's policy severely tainted his credibility as many saw the broken promise as malicious. Another motive was that Zia widely suspected that once out of power the size of the Pakistan Peoples Party rallies would swell and better performance in elections was possible. This led to request for postponement of elections by the right-wing Islamists as well as left-wing socialists, formerly allied with Bhutto, which displaced Bhutto in the first place. Zia dispatched an intelligence unit, known as ISI's Political Wing, sending Brigadier-General Taffazul Hussain Siddiqiui, to Bhutto's native Province, Sindh, to assess whether people would accept martial law. The Political Wing also contacted the several right-wing Islamists and conservatives, promising an election, with PNA power-sharing the government with Zia. Zia successfully divided and separated the secular forces from right-wing Islamists and conservatives, and later purged each member of the secular front.

A Disqualification Tribunal was formed, and several individuals who had been members of parliament were charged with malpractice and disqualified from participating in politics at any level for the next seven years. A white paper document was issued, incriminating the deposed Bhutto government on several counts.

It is reported by senior officers that when Zia met federal secretaries for the first time as leader of the country after martial law, he said that "He does not possess the charisma of Bhutto, personality of Ayub Khan or the legitimacy of Liaquat Ali Khan" thereby implying how can he be marketed.

Tenure as Chief Martial Law Administrator 
After deposing Prime Minister Bhutto on 5 July 1977, Zia-ul-Haq declared martial law, and appointed himself Chief Martial Law Administrator, which he remained until becoming president on 16 September 1978.

The doctrine of necessity 

Nusrat Bhutto, the wife of the deposed Prime Minister, filed a suit against Zia's military regime, challenging the validity of the July 1977 military coup. The Supreme Court of Pakistan ruled, in what would later be known as the Doctrine of Necessity (not to be confused with the 1954 doctrine of necessity) that, given the dangerously unstable political situation of the time, Zia's overthrowing of the Bhutto government was legal on the grounds of necessity. The judgement tightened the general's hold on the government. When Bhutto appeared personally to argue his appeal in the supreme court, he almost affirmed his concurrence with the judges present for not letting off a judgement without imposing some conditions on ruling military government.

Zulfikar Ali Bhutto trial 
Former elected Prime Minister Zulfikar Ali Bhutto was arrested during the coup but released shortly afterwards. Upon his release, Bhutto travelled the country amid adulatory crowds of PPP supporters.  On 3 September 1977, he was arrested again by the Army on charges of authorising the murder of a political opponent in March 1974.  The trial proceedings began 24 October 1977 and lasted five months.
On 18 March 1978, Bhutto was declared guilty of murder and was sentenced to death.

In the words of Aftab Kazie and Roedad Khan, Zia hated Bhutto and had used inappropriate language and insults to describe Bhutto and his colleagues. The Supreme Court ruled four to three in favour of execution. The High Court had given him the death sentence on charges of the murder of the father of Ahmed Raza Kasuri, a dissident PPP politician. Despite many clemency appeals from foreign leaders requesting Zia to commute Bhutto's death sentence, Zia dismissed the appeals and upheld the death sentence.
On 4 April 1979, Bhutto was hanged, after the Supreme Court upheld the death sentence as passed by the Lahore High Court.

The hanging of an elected prime minister by a military dictator was condemned by the international community and by lawyers and jurists across Pakistan. Bhutto's trial was highly controversial.

Appointment of martial law administrators

Martial law judges

The Ad hoc appointments of senior justices at the Supreme Court of Pakistan was one of the earliest and major steps were taken out by the military government under General Zia-ul-Haq. Zia had recognised the fact that since, Bhutto had good equations with the governments of the Soviet Union, China, and all the important western countries, excluding the United States. Still, it was a formidable array of sovereigns, presidents and prime ministers and the PPP can be forgiven for making a massive political miscalculations.

After calling for martial law, Zia pressured President Fazal Illahi to appoint Justice Sheikh Anwarul Haq to Chief Justice of Pakistan on 23 September 1977. Immediately, chief justice Yaqub Ali was forcefully removed from the office after the latter agreed to re-hear the petition filed at the supreme court by the peoples party's chairwoman Nusrat Bhutto on 20 September 1977. After Justice Yaqub Ali's removal, Bhutto objected to the inclusion of the new Chief Justice, Sheikh Anwar-ul-Haq, as a chief justice of the Bench on the grounds that by accepting the office of acting president during the absence of Zia-ul-Haq from the country, he had compromised his impartial status. Bhutto also stated that the Chief Justice in his public statements had been critical of his government in the recent past.

The objection was over-ruled by the Chief Justice Anwarul Haq, and the case of Bhutto was again heard by the Chief Justice Anwar-ul-Haq as the bench's lead judge, and presided the whole case of Zulfikar Ali Bhutto while forcing the martial law throughout Pakistan. Shortly, after Zia's return, another judge Mushtak Ahmad also gained Zia and Anwar-ul-Haq's support and elevated as the ad hoc Chief Justice of Lahore High Court; he was too part of the bench who retained the death sentence of Zulfikar Ali Bhutto even though Bhutto was not declared guilty of the murder of the political opponent. In 1979, when Zia departed for Saudi Arabia, Justice Haq served as interim president of Pakistan.

Martial law governors

The Zia regime largely made use of installing high-profile military generals to carte blanche provincial administration under martial law. Zia's Guides Cavalry comrade Lieutenant-General Fazhle Haque was appointed Martial Law Administrator of Khyber-Pakhtunkhwa Province.  Lieutenant-General Fazle Haque was considered a strong vocal General and a strong man. General Haque was the commander of the XI Corps, and commanding-general officer of the Army elements responsible for fighting a secret war against Soviet Union.

The second appointment was of Lieutenant-General S.M. Abbasi who was appointed Martial Law Administrator of Sindh Province; his tenure too saw civil disorder amid student riots. By contrast, third martial law administrator appointment of Lieutenant-General Ghulam Jilani Khan to the Punjab Province made much headway in beautifying Lahore extending infrastructure, and muting political opposition. The ascent of Nawaz Sharif to Chief Minister of Punjab was largely due to General Jilani's sponsorship. Perhaps most crucially, final and fourth martial law administrator appointment was then-Lieutenant-General Rahimuddin Khan. Lieutenant-General Rahimuddin Khan was appointed to the post of Martial Law Administrator of Balochistan Province saw the disbanding of the Baloch insurgency, the containment of Afghan Mujahideen, as well as the construction of nuclear test sites in the Chagai District.

Zia's tenure saw the influx of heroin, sophisticated weaponry, and countless refugees in from neighbouring Afghanistan. Law and order deterioration was worse after he appointed Mr. Junejo as Prime minister in 1985. The government did not locate evidence of Zia having a relationship in the heroin trade, but has been considered.

Zia benefited from the extremely capable martial law administrators who previously had worked with the military governments of former president Yahya Khan and Ayub Khan in the 1960s. One of the notable officers that had worked with him were General Khalid Arief, Chief of Army Staff, and Admiral Mohammad Shariff, Chairman Joint Chiefs. Both were noted by Western governments as highly capable and had wide experience from the military government of the East-Pakistan and remained General Zia' confidential members.

Both Admiral Sharif and General Arif handled the matters efficiently if the matters were out of control by Zia. In 1979, Zia influenced the Navy's Promotion Board several times after he succeeded first in the appointment of Admiral Caramatt Nazi as Chief of Naval Staff in 1979, and Admiral Tarik Kamal Khan, also chief of naval staff, in 1983. On his request, then-President Fazal Illahi approved the appointment of General Anwar Shamim as Chief of Air Staff and following President's resignation, Zia appointed Shamim as the Deputy Chief Martial Law Administrator. In the matters of serious national security, General Zia had taken the chief of air staff and chief of naval staff in confidence after he discussed the matters with the respected chiefs of Staff. Zia's appointment in inter-services were highly crucial for his military government and pre-emptive measure to ensure the continuous loyalty of Navy and Air Force to himself and his new military government.

Tenure as President of Pakistan

Assumption of the post of President of Pakistan 

Despite the dismissal of most of the Bhutto government, President Fazal Ilahi Chaudhry was persuaded to continue in office as a figurehead. After completing his term, and despite Zia's insistence to accept an extension as President, Chaudhry resigned, and Zia took the office of President of Pakistan on 16 September 1978.

Political structural changes

Formation of Majlis-e-Shoora 

Although ostensibly only holding office until free elections could be held, General Zia, like the previous military governments, disapproved of the lack of discipline and orderliness that often accompanies multiparty "parliamentary democracy." He preferred a "presidential" form of government and a system of decision making by technical experts, or "technocracy". His first replacement for the parliament or National Assembly was a Majlis-e-Shoora, or "consultative council." After banning all political parties in 1979 he disbanded Parliament and at the end of 1981 set up the majlis, which was to act as a sort of board of advisors to the President and assist with the process of Islamization. The 350 members of the Shoora were to be nominated by the President and possessed only the power to consult with him, and in reality served only to endorse decisions already taken by the government.  Most members of the Shoora were intellectuals, scholars, ulema, journalists, economists, and professionals in different fields.

Zia's parliament and his military government reflect the idea of "military-bureaucratic technocracy" (MBT) where professionals, engineers, and high-profile military officers were initially part of his military government. His antipathy for the politicians led the promotion of bureaucratic-technocracy which was seen a strong weapon of countering the politicians and their political strongholds. Senior statesman and technocrats were included physicist-turned diplomat Agha Shahi, jurist Sharifuddin Perzada, corporate leader Nawaz Sharif, economist Mahbub ul Haq, and senior statesman Aftab Kazie, Roedad Khan, and chemist-turned diplomat Ghulam Ishaq Khan were a few of the leading technocratic figures in his military government.

Referendum of 1984 
After Bhutto's execution, momentum to hold elections began to mount both internationally and within Pakistan. But before handing over power to elected representatives, Zia-ul-Haq attempted to secure his position as the head of state. A referendum was held on 19 December 1984 with the option being to elect or reject the General as the future President, the wording of the referendum making a vote against Zia appear to be a vote against Islam. According to official figures 97.8% of votes were cast in favour of Zia, however only 20% of the electorate participated in the referendum.

1985 elections and constitutional amendments 

After holding the 1984 referendum, Zia succumbed to international pressure and gave permission to election commission to hold national wide general elections but without political parties in February 1985. Most of the major opposing political parties decided to boycott the elections but election results showed that many victors belonged to one party or the other. Critics complained that ethnic and sectarian mobilisation filled the void left by banning political parties (or making elections "non-partisan"), to the detriment of national integration.

The General worked to give himself the power to dismiss the Prime Minister dissolve the National Assembly, appoint provincial governors and the chief of the armed forces.  His prime minister Muhammad Khan Junejo was known as an unassuming and soft-spoken Sindhi.

Before handing over the power to the new government and lifting the martial law, Zia got the new legislature to retroactively accept all of Zia's actions of the past eight years, including his coup of 1977. He also managed to get several amendments passed, most notably the Eighth Amendment, which granted "reserve powers" to the president to dissolve the Parliament. However, this amendment considerably reduced the power he'd previously granted himself to dissolve the legislature, at least on paper. The text of the amendment permitted Zia to dissolve the Parliament only if the government had been toppled by a vote of no confidence and it was obvious that no one could form a government or the government could not function in a constitutional manner.

Economic policy 

In general Zia gave economic development and policy a fairly low priority (aside from Islamization) and delegating its management to technocrats such as Ghulam Ishaq Khan, Aftab Qazi and Vaseem Jaffrey.
 However, between 1977 and 1986, the country experienced an average annual growth in the GNP of 6.8%—the highest in the world at that time—thanks in large part to remittances from the overseas workers, rather than government policy. The first year of Zia's government coincided with a dramatic rise in remittances, which totalled $3.2 billion/year for most of the 1980s, accounted for 10 percent of Pakistans's GDP; 45 percent of its current account receipts, and 40 percent of total foreign exchange earnings.

By the time General Zia had initiated the coup against Prime Minister Zulfikar Bhutto, the economic cycle process of nationalisation program was completed. The socialist orientation and nationalisation program was slowly reversed; the idea of corporatisation was heavily favoured by President Zia-ul-Haq to direct the authoritarianism in the nationalised industries. One of his well-known and earliest initiatives were aimed to Islamize the national economy which featured the Interest-free economic cycle.  No actions towards privatising the industries were ordered by President Zia; only three steel mill industries were returned to its previous owners.

By the end of 1987, the finance ministry had begun studying the process of engaging the gradual privatisation and economic liberalisation.

Soviet-Afghan War and strategic initiatives

Soviet invasion and Soviet–Afghan War 

On 25 December 1979, the Soviet Union (USSR) intervened in Afghanistan. Following this invasion, Zia chaired a meeting and was asked by several cabinet members to refrain from interfering in the war, owing to the vastly superior military power of the USSR. Zia, however, was ideologically opposed to the idea of communism taking over a neighbouring country, supported by the fear of Soviet advancement into Pakistan, particularly Balochistan, in search of warm waters, and made no secret about his intentions of monetarily and militarily aiding the Afghan resistance (the Mujahideen) with major assistance from the United States.

During this meeting, the Director-General of the Directorate for Inter-Services Intelligence (ISI) then-Lieutenant-General Akhtar Abdur Rahman advocated for a covert operation in Afghanistan by arming Islamic Extremists. After this meeting, Zia authorised this operation under General Rahman, and it was later merged with Operation Cyclone, a programme funded by the United States and the Central Intelligence Agency (CIA).

In November 1982, Zia travelled to Moscow to attend the funeral of Leonid Brezhnev, the late General Secretary of the Communist Party of the Soviet Union. Soviet Foreign Minister Andrei Gromyko and new Secretary General Yuri Andropov met with Zia there. Andropov expressed indignation over Pakistan's support of the Afghan resistance against the Soviet Union and its satellite state, Socialist Afghanistan. Zia took his hand and assured him, "General Secretary, believe me, Pakistan wants nothing but very good relations with the Soviet Union". According to Gromyko, Zia's sincerity convinced them, but Zia's actions didn't live up to his words.

Zia reversed many of Bhutto's foreign policy initiatives by first establishing stronger links with the United States, Japan, and the Western world. Zia broken off relations with the Socialist state and State capitalism became his major economic policy. US politician Charlie Wilson claims that he worked with Zia and the CIA to channel Soviet weapons that Israel captured from the PLO in Lebanon to fighters in Afghanistan. Wilson claims that Zia remarked to him: "Just don't put any stars of David on the boxes".

Consolidation of atomic bomb program 

One of the earliest initiatives taken by Zia in 1977, was to militarize the integrated atomic energy program which was founded by Zulfiqar Ali Bhutto in 1972. During the first stages, the program was under the control of Bhutto and the Directorate for Science, under Science Advisor Dr. Mubashir Hassan, who was heading the civilian committee that supervised the construction of the facilities and laboratories. This atomic bomb project had no boundaries with Munir Ahmad Khan and Dr. Abdul Qadeer Khan leading their efforts separately and reported to Bhutto and his science adviser Dr. Hassan who had little interest in the atomic bomb project. Major-General Zahid Ali Akbar, an engineering officer, had little role in the atomic project; Zia responded by taking over the program under military control and disbanded the civilian directorate when he ordered the arrest of Hassan. This whole giant nuclear energy project was transferred into the administrative hands of Major-General Akbar who was soon made the Lieutenant-General and Engineer-in-Chief of the Pakistan Army Corps of Engineers to deal with the authorities whose co-operation was required. Akbar consolidated the entire project by placing the scientific research under military control, setting boundaries and goals. Akbar proved to be an extremely capable officer in the matters of science and technology when he aggressively led the development of nuclear weapons under Munir Ahmad Khan and Abdul Qadeer Khan in a matter of five years.

By the time, Zia assumed control, the research facilities became fully functional and 90% of the work on atom bomb project was completed.  Both the Pakistan Atomic Energy Commission (PAEC) and the Khan Research Laboratories (KRL) had built the extensive research infrastructure started by Bhutto.  Akbar's office was shifted to Army's General Headquarters (GHQ) and Akbar guided Zia on key matters of nuclear science and atomic bomb production. He became the first engineering officer to have acknowledge Zia about the success of this energy project into a fully matured program. On the recommendation of Akbar, Zia approved the appointment of Munir Ahmad Khan as the scientific director of the atomic bomb project, as Zia was convinced by Akbar that civilian scientists under Munir Khan's directorship were at their best to counter international pressure.

This was proved when the PAEC conducted the cold-fission test of a fission device, codename Kirana-I on 11 March 1983 at the Weapon-Testing Laboratories-I, under the leadership of weapon-testing laboratory's director Dr. Ishfaq Ahmad. Lieutenant-General Zahid Akbar went to GHQ and notified Zia about the success of this test.  The PAEC responded by conducting several cold-tests throughout the 1980s, a policy also continued by Benazir Bhutto in the 1990s. According to the reference in the book, "Eating Grass", Zia was so deeply convinced of the infiltration of Western and American moles and spies into the project, that he extended his role in the atomic bomb, which reflected extreme "paranoia", in both his personal and professional life. He virtually had PAEC and KRL separated from each other and made critical administrative decisions rather than putting scientists in charge of the aspects of the atomic programs. His actions spurred innovation in the atomic bomb project and an intense secrecy and security culture permeated PAEC and KRL.

Nuclear diplomacy

Unlike Bhutto, who faced rogue criticism and a heated diplomatic war with the United States throughout the 1970s, Zia took different diplomatic approaches to counter the international pressure. From 1979 to 1983, the country was made a subject of attack by international organization for not signing the Nuclear Non-Proliferation Treaty (NPT); Zia deftly neutralized international pressure by tagging Pakistan's nuclear weapons program to the nuclear designs of the neighboring Indian nuclear program. Zia, with the help of Munir Ahmad Khan and Agha Shahi, Foreign Minister, drew a five-point proposal as a practical rejoinder to world pressure on Pakistan to sign the NPT; the points including the renouncing of the use of nuclear weapons.

Following the success of Operation Opera – in which an Israeli Air Force strike took place to destroy the Iraqi nuclear program in 1981 – suspicion grew in Pakistan that the Indian Air Force had similar plans for Pakistan. In a private meeting with General Anwar Shamim, then-Chief of Air Staff, Zia had notified General Shamim that the Indian Air Force had plans to infiltrate Pakistan's nuclear energy project, citing solid evidence. Shamim felt that the Air Force was unable to divert such attacks, therefore, he advised Zia to use diplomacy through Munir Ahmad Khan to divert the attacks. At Vienna, Munir Ahmad Khan met with Indian physicist Raja Ramanna and notified him that such an attack would provoke a nuclear war between the two countries. In the meantime, Shamim decided to start the program to acquire the F-16 Falcons and A-5 Fanton jets for the Pakistan Air Force. Shamim launched Operation Sentinel- a counter operation that thwarted the Israeli Air Force attempt to sabotage Pakistan's nuclear energy project—forced Indian Premier Indira Gandhi to hold talks with Pakistan on nuclear issues and directed a high delegation to Pakistan where both countries pledged not to assist or attack each other's facilities. In 1985, following the induction of the F-16 Falcons and A-5 Fantons, Shamim commissioned the Air Force Strategic Command to protect and battle the weapons of mass destruction.

In 1977, Zia ultimately adopted the policy of "nuclear opacity" to deliberately deny the atomic bomb programs. This policy of nuclear ambiguity was adopted after witnessing the success of Israel's nuclear program and on multiple occasions Zia broke his words and promises concerning the nature of the country's atomic bomb project. On nuclear policy issues, Zia deliberately misguided the United States and concealed classified information from the outside world. The United States trusted Zia's sincerity and his promises made to the United States; Zia gave assurances to the United States not to produce weapons-grade plutonium and highly enriched uranium (HEU) above a 5% level. However, the Deputy Director of the Central Intelligence Agency, Vernon Walter, confronted Zia on his secret trip to Pakistan in October 1981. Confronted with the evidence, Zia acknowledged that the information "must be true," but then denied everything, leading Walters to conclude that: "either Zia "did not know the facts" or was the "most superb and patriotic liar I have ever met...".

Nuclear proliferation

Soon after the coup, the clandestine nuclear energy project was no longer a secret to the outside world. Part of his strategy was the promotion of nuclear proliferation in anti-western states (such as North Korea, Iran, and communist China) to aid their own nuclear ambitions, to divert international attention which was difficult. In 1981, Zia contracted with China when he sent weapon-grade uranium to China and also built the centrifuge laboratory which increasingly enhanced the Chinese nuclear program. This act encouraged Abdul Qadeer Khan, who allegedly tried to aid the Libyan nuclear programme but because Libya–Pakistan relations were strained, Khan was warned of serious consequences. This policy envisaged that this would deflect international pressure onto these countries, and Pakistan would be spared the international community's wrath.

After Zia's death, his successor General Mirza Aslam Beg, as Chief of Army Staff, encouraged Abdul Qadeer Khan and gave him a free hand to work with some like-minded nations such as North Korea, Iran and Libya which also wanted to pursue their nuclear ambitions for a variety of reasons.  In 2004, Abdul Khan's dismissal from the nuclear weapons program was considered a face saving exercise by the Pakistan Armed Forces and political establishment under the then Chief of Army Staff and President General Pervez Musharraf. Zia's nuclear proliferation policy had a deep impact on the world, especially anti-western states, most nominally North Korea and Iran. In the 2000s (decade), North Korea would soon follow the same suit after it was targeted by the international community for its on-going nuclear program. In the 2000s (decade), North Korea attempted to aid the Syrian and Iranian nuclear program in the 1990s. The North Korean connection to the Syrian nuclear program was exposed in 2007 by Israel in its successful strategic operation, Orchard, which resulted in them sabotaging the Syrian nuclear program as well as the deaths of 10 senior North Korean scientists who were aiding the nuclear program.

Expansion

Even though Zia had removed the Bhutto sentiment in the nuclear energy project, Zia did not completely disband Bhutto's policy on nuclear weapons.  After the retirement of Zahid Ali Akbar, Zia transferred control of the nuclear weapons program to Bhutto's close aide Munir Ahmad Khan, Chairman of the Pakistan Atomic Energy Commission. Soon, Zia promoted Khan as the technical director of the entire program as well as appointing Khan as his Science Adviser. With the support of handpicked civilian Prime Minister Muhammad Juneijo, Zia sanctioned the launch of the 50 Megawatt (MW) heavy water plutonium production reactor, known as Khushab-I, at Khushab in 1985. Zia also took initiatives to launch the space projects as spin-off to nuclear project. Zia appointed nuclear engineer Salim Mehmud as the Administrator of the Space Research Commission. Zia also launched the work on the country's first satellite, Badr-1, a military satellite. In 1987, Zia launched the clandestine aerospace project, the Integrated Missile Research Program under General Anwar Shamim in 1985, and later under Lieutenant-General Talat Masood in 1987.

The war legacy 
The rise of the illicit drug trade and its spread through Pakistan to the rest of the world increased tremendously during the Soviet-Afghan war. Afghanistan's drug industry began to take off after the Soviet invasion in 1979. Desperate for cash with which to buy weapons, various elements in the anti-Communist resistance turned to the drug trade. This was tolerated if not condoned by their American sponsors such as the CIA.

'Sharization' of Pakistan

The "primary" policy or "centerpiece" of Zia's government was "Sharization" or "Islamization".

In 1977, prior to the coup, the drinking and selling of wine by Muslims, along with nightclubs, and horse racing was banned by Prime Minister Bhutto in an effort to stem the tide of street Islamization.
Zia went much further, committing himself to enforce Nizam-e-Mustafa ("Rule of the prophet" or Islamic System, i.e. establishing an Islamic state and sharia law), a significant turn from Pakistan's predominantly secular law, inherited from the British.

In his first televised speech to the country as head of state Zia declared that
Pakistan which was created in the name of Islam will continue to survive only if it sticks to Islam. That is why I consider the introduction of [an] Islamic system as an essential prerequisite for the country.
In the past he complained, "Many a ruler did what they pleased in the name of Islam."

Zia established "Sharia Benches" in each High Court (later the Federal Sharia Court) to judge legal cases using the teachings of the Quran and the Sunna, and to bring Pakistan's legal statutes into alignment with Islamic doctrine.
Zia bolstered the influence of the ulama (Islamic clergy) and the Islamic parties. 10,000s of activists from the Jamaat-e-Islami party were appointed to government posts to ensure the continuation of his agenda after his passing. Conservative ulama (Islamic scholars) were added to the Council of Islamic Ideology.

Islamization was a sharp change from Bhutto's original philosophical rationale captured in the slogan, "Food, clothing, and shelter". In Zia's view, socialist economics and a secular-socialist orientation served only to upset Pakistan's natural order and weaken its moral fiber. General Zia defended his policies in an interview in 1979 given to British journalist Ian Stephens:

How much of Zia's motivation came from piety and how much from political calculation is disputed. One author points out that Zia was conspicuously silent on the dispute between the heterodox Zikri and the 'Ulama in Balochistan where he needed stability. Secular and leftist forces accused Zia of manipulating Islam for political ends. According to Nusrat Bhutto, former First Lady of Pakistan:

How much success Zia had using state-sponsored Islamization to strengthen national cohesion is also disputed. Religious riots broke out in 1983 and 1984. Sectarian divisions between Sunnis and Shia worsened over the issue of the 1979 Zakat ordinance, but differences in Fiqh jurisprudence also arose in marriage and divorce, inheritance and wills and imposition of hadd punishments.

Among Sunni Muslims, Deobandis and Barelvis also had disputes. Zia favoured the Deobandi doctrine and so the Sufi pirs of Sindh (who were Barelvis) joined the anti-Zia Movement for the Restoration of Democracy.

Hudood Ordinance

In one of his first and most controversial measures to Islamize Pakistani society was the replacement of parts of the Pakistan Penal Code (PPC) with the 1979 "Hudood Ordinance." (Hudood meaning limits or restrictions, as in limits of acceptable behavior in Islamic law.) The Ordinance added new criminal offences of adultery and fornication to Pakistani law, and new punishments of whipping, amputation, and stoning to death.

For theft or robbery, the PPC punishments of imprisonment or fine, or both, were replaced by amputation of the right hand of the offender for theft, and amputation of the right hand and left foot for robbery. For Zina (extramarital sex) the provisions relating to adultery were replaced by the Ordinance with punishments of flogged 100 lashes for those unmarried offenders, and stoning to death for married offenders.

All these punishments were dependent on proof required for hadd being met. In practice the Hudd requirement—four Muslim men of good repute testifying as witness to the crime—was seldom met. As of 2014, no offenders have been stoned or had limbs amputated by the Pakistani judicial system. To be found guilty of theft, zina, or drinking alcohol by less strict tazir standards—where the punishment was flogging and/or imprisonment—was common, and there have been many floggings.

More worrisome for human rights and women's rights advocates, lawyers and politicians was the incarceration of thousands of rape victims on charges of zina. The onus of providing proof in a rape case rests with the woman herself. Uncorroborated testimony by women was inadmissible in hudood crimes. If the victim/accuser was unable to prove her allegation, bringing the case to court was considered equivalent to a confession of sexual intercourse outside of lawful marriage. Despite this the ordinance remained in force until the Women's Protection Bill was passed in 2006.

Although the Sharia punishments were imposed, the due process, witnesses, law of evidence, and prosecution system remained Anglo-Saxon.

The hybridization of Pakistan penal code with Islamic laws was difficult because of the difference in the underlying logic of the two legal systems.  PPC was kingly law, Haddood is a religious and community-based law.

Islamic Law
Under Zia, the order for women to cover their heads while in public was implemented in public schools, colleges and state television. Women's participation in sports and the performing arts was severely restricted.  Following Sharia law, women's legal testimony was given half the weight of a man's, .

In 1980 the "Zakat and Ushr Ordinance, 1980" was implemented. The measure called for a 2.5% annual deduction from personal bank accounts on the first day of Ramadan, with Zia stating that the revenues would be used for poverty relief. Zakat committees were established to oversee distribution of the funds.

In 1981 interest payments were replaced by "profit and loss" accounts (though profit was thought to be simply interest by another name). Textbooks were overhauled to remove un-Islamic material, and un-Islamic books were removed from libraries.

Eating and drinking during Ramadan was outlawed, attempts were made to enforce praying of salat five times a day.

Blasphemy ordinances
To outlaw blasphemy, the Pakistan Penal Code (PPC) and the Criminal Procedure Code (CrPC) were amended through ordinances in 1980, 1982 and 1986. The 1980 law prohibited derogatory remarks against Islamic personages, and carried a three-year prison sentence. In 1982 the small Ahmadiyya religious minority were prohibited from saying or implying they were Muslims. In 1986 declaring anything implying disrespect to the Islamic prophet Muhammad, Ahl al-Bayt (family members of Muhammad), Sahabah (companions of Muhammad) or Sha'ar-i-Islam (Islamic symbols) was made a cognisable offence, punishable with imprisonment or fine, or both.

Madrassa expansions
Traditional religious madrassass in Pakistan received state sponsorship for the first time, under the General Zia-ul-Haq's administration, their number grew from 893 to 2,801. Most were Deobandi in doctrinal orientation, while one quarter of them were Barelvi. They received funding from Zakat councils and provided free religious training, room and board to impoverished Pakistanis. The schools, which banned televisions and radios, have been criticised by authors for stoking sectarian hatred both between Muslim sects and against non-Muslims.

Cultural policies

In a 1979 address to the nation, Zia decried the Western culture and music in the country. Soon afterwards, PTV, the national television network ceased playing music videos and only patriotic songs were broadcast. New taxes were levied on the film industry and most of the cinemas in Lahore were shut down. New tax rates were introduced, further decreasing cinema attendances.

It was under Zia and the economic prosperity of his era that the country's urban middle and lower-middle-classes expanded and Western 1980s fashion wear and hairstyle spread in popularity, and rock music bands gained momentum, according to leftist cultural critic Nadeem F. Paracha.

Welfare of the people with disabilities
During his tenure, he oversaw passing of an ordinance for the welfare of people with disabilities. The ordinance is called "The Disabled Persons (Employment and Rehabilitation) Ordinance, 1981" and it was passed into law on 29 December 1981. It provides the measures for the employment, rehabilitation and welfare of the people with disabilities.

Dismissal of the Junejo government and call for new elections 

As time passed, the legislature wanted to have more freedom and power and by the beginning of 1988, rumours about the differences between Prime Minister Muhammad Khan Junejo and Zia were rife.

It is said by some that Zia-Junejo rift was encouraged by late Mahboob-ul-Haq and Junejo's insistence on signing Geneva pact without deciding the composition of next government of Afghanistan before Soviet withdrawal. Junejo also gave Benazir a seat next to him in parleys before that. Junejo did not strengthen the Islamization drive and rather weakened it. His era led to serious disturbances in Karachi and ultimately Karachi went into the secular control of MQM from the clutches of Sunnis Jamaat-e-Islami.

Ojhri Camp blast had irreversibly weakened Zia. Junejo was committed to make an investigation into the Ojhri camp disaster. This couldn't be digested by President as it would expose the involvement of ISI and Zia co- fellow Generals. After defeat of Soviet army, America wanted to audit the ammunition and missiles supplied to Pakistan for Mujahideen, most of which has been stored by Pakistan for future targets against India or other enemies. So Zia planned this event in a very cruel manner, having sacrificed the lives of people of Pakistan for fulfillment of their own agenda.

On 29 May 1988, Zia dissolved the National Assembly and removed the Prime Minister under article 58(2)b of the amended Constitution. Apart from many other reasons, Prime Minister Junejo's decision to sign the Geneva Accord against the wishes of Zia, and his open declarations of removing any military personnel found responsible for an explosion at a munitions dump at Ojhri Camp, on the outskirts of army headquarters in Rawalpindi, earlier in the year, proved to be some of the major factors responsible for his removal.

Zia promised to hold elections in 1988 after the dismissal of Junejo government. He said that he would hold elections within the next 90 days. The late Zulfikar Ali Bhutto's daughter Benazir Bhutto had returned from exile earlier in 1986, and had announced that she would be contesting the elections. With Bhutto's popularity somewhat growing, and a decrease in international aid following the Soviet withdrawal from Afghanistan, Zia was in an increasingly difficult political situation.

Death 

Zia died in a plane crash on 17 August 1988. After witnessing a US M1 Abrams tank demonstration in Bahawalpur, Zia had left the city in the Punjab province by C-130B Hercules aircraft. The aircraft departed from Bahawalpur Airport and was expected to reach Islamabad International Airport. Shortly after a smooth takeoff, the control tower lost contact with the aircraft. Witnesses who saw the plane in the air afterward claim it was flying erratically, then nosedived and exploded on impact. In addition to Zia, 31 others died in the plane crash, including chairman Joint Chiefs of Staff Committee General Akhtar Abdur Rahman, close associate of Zia, Brigadier Siddique Salik, the American ambassador to Pakistan Arnold Lewis Raphel and General Herbert M. Wassom, the head of the US military aid mission to Pakistan. Ghulam Ishaq Khan, the Senate chairman announced Zia's death on radio and TV. Conditions surrounding his death have given rise to many conspiracy theories. There is speculation that the United States, India, the Soviet Union (in retaliation for Pakistani support of the mujahideen in Afghanistan) or an alliance of them and internal groups within Zia's military were behind the incident.

A board of inquiry was set up to investigate the crash. It concluded 'the most probable cause of the crash was a criminal act of sabotage perpetrated in the aircraft'. It also suggested that poisonous gases were released which incapacitated the passengers and crew, which would explain why no Mayday signal was given. There was also speculation into other facts involving the details of the investigation. A flight recorder (black box) was not located after the crash even though previous C-130 aircraft did have them installed.

Maj. Gen. (retd) Mahmud Ali Durrani, who was suspected by many circles within Pakistan and also by then United States ambassador to India, John Gunther Dean, for being "extraordinarily insistent" with President Zia to visit the demonstration, is considered to be the prime suspect in the incident. He claimed later that reports of Israeli and Indian involvement in Zia's plane crash were only speculations.

Legacy

Funeral and aftermath 
His funeral was held on 19 August 1988 near Islamabad. As a 21-gun salute of light artillery resounded off the lush Margalla Hills, nearly one million mourners joined in chants of "Zia ul-Haq, you will live as long as the sun and moon remain above." His remains were laid to rest in a  dirt grave in front of the huge, modern Faisal Mosque that Zia had built as a symbol of Pakistani-Saudi friendship. Also in attendance was his successor President Ghulam Ishaq Khan, chiefs of staff of armed forces, chairman joint chiefs, and other high military and civil officials. Former US Secretary of State George P. Shultz also laid a floral wreath at Zia's grave.

Public image
Even after his death, Zia-ul-Haq remained a highly polarizing and widely discussed figure in the country's intellectual and political circles. Out of the country's short history, Zia-ul-Haq's legacy remains a most toxic, enduring, and tamper-proof legacy, according to the editorial written in Dawn. He is also praised for defeating the Soviets. Indian journalist Kallol Bhattacherjee, an author of a book on Afghanistan, said:"There will not be another Zia in South Asia. He was unique and multidimensional like all complex characters of South Asian history. I admire Zia's guts, though not his methods, especially in regards to Islam. He successfully took on nuclear India and changed the balance of power that Indira Gandhi created in the 1971 war and broke all rules to acquire nuclear weapons for Pakistan."Historians and political scientists widely discussed and studied his policy making skills, some authors noting him as "The Ringmaster", "Master of Illusion" and "Master Tactician". However, his most remembered and enduring legacy was his indirect involvement and military strategies, by proxy supporting the Mujahideen, against the USSR's war in Afghanistan. His reign also helped the conservatives to rise at the national politics against Benazir Bhutto. He is also noted as being one of Pakistan's most successful generals, placing the armed forces in charge of the country's affairs. During his regime, western styles in hair, clothing, and music flooded the country. The 1980s gave birth to Pakistani rock music, which expressed Pakistani nationalism in the country. Overall Zia is remembered in a negative light in Pakistan for his promotion of radicalization.

Eighteenth Amendment to the Constitution of Pakistan
With the passing of the Eighteenth Amendment to the Constitution of Pakistan (2010), the executive powers General Zia had legislated were permanently deleted from the Constitution of Pakistan.

Awards and decorations 

{| class="wikitable" style="margin:1em auto; text-align:center;"
|
|Sitara-e-Harb 1965 War
(War Star 1965)
|Sitara-e-Harb 1971 War
(War Star 1971)
|
|-
|Tamgha-e-Jang 1965 War
(War Medal 1965)
|Tamgha-e-Jang 1971 War
(War Medal 1971)
|Pakistan Tamgha
(Pakistan Medal)

1947
|Tamgha-e-Sad Saala Jashan-e-
Wiladat-e-Quaid-e-Azam

(100th Birth Anniversary of

Muhammad Ali Jinnah)

1976
|-
|Hijri Tamgha
(Hijri Medal)

1979
|Tamgha-e-Jamhuria
(Republic Commemoration Medal)

1956
|Order of Independence 
(Jordan)

1971
|Order of the
Star of Jordan 
(1971)
|-
|Order of the Rajamitrabhorn'(Thailand)
|Burma Star|War Medal1939-1945
|General Service Medal World War 2(Awarded in 1945''')
|}

 Portrayals in popular culture 
Zia has been portrayed in English language popular culture a number of times including:
 In the comic Shattered Visage, it is implied that Zia's death was orchestrated by the same intelligence agency that ran The Village from the show The Prisoner.
 Zia was portrayed by Indian actor Om Puri in the 2007 film Charlie Wilson's War.
 Zia is caricatured as one of the main protagonists in Mohammed Hanif's 2008 satirical novel A Case of Exploding Mangoes which is loosely based around the events of his death.
 The oppressive regime of Zia-ul-Haq and the execution of Zulfikar Ali Bhutto was referenced in the book Songs of Blood and Sword, a non-fiction memoir by Murtaza Bhutto's daughter Fatima Bhutto.

 See also 

 Joanne Herring
 Human Rights in Pakistan under General Zia-ul-Haq
 Politics of Pakistan
 Line of succession to the President of Pakistan
 List of presidents of Pakistan
 Military dictatorship
 Oppression under the regime of General Zia-ul-Haq
 Corporate capitalisation

 References 

Bibliography

 
 
 

 Further reading 
 
 
 
 
 
 
 
 
 
 
 
 
 
 
 Ayub, Muhammad (2005). An Army, its Role and Rule: A History of the Pakistan Army from Independence to Kargil 1947–1999. Pittsburgh: RoseDog Books. .

 External links 

 Biography video 'Shaheed e Islam
 Annotated Bibliography for Muhammad Zia-ul-Haq from the Alsos Digital Library for Nuclear Issues
 "Who Killed Zia?" by Edward Jay Epstein for Vanity Fair'', September 1989
 Official profile at Pakistan Army website
 The Constitution of the Islamic Republic of Pakistan
 General Zia-ul-Haq's plane crash due to mechanical problem (Times of London)
 Mohammad Zia-ul-Haq President of Pakistan on Encyclopedia Britannica

|-

|-

|-

|-

 
1924 births
1988 deaths
Pakistani Muslims
Pakistani Salafis
Punjabi people
Chiefs of Army Staff, Pakistan
Leaders who took power by coup
Military government of Pakistan (1977–1988)
Non-U.S. alumni of the Command and General Staff College
Pakistan Armoured Corps officers
Pakistani anti-communists
Pakistani generals
Pakistani Islamists
People from Jalandhar
People of the Soviet–Afghan War
Presidents of Pakistan
H
State leaders killed in aviation accidents or incidents
Delhi University alumni
State funerals in Pakistan
St. Stephen's College, Delhi alumni
Victims of aviation accidents or incidents in 1988
Victims of aviation accidents or incidents in Pakistan
Indian expatriates in Malaysia
Indian expatriates in British Burma
Pakistan Command and Staff College alumni